Education in Spain is regulated by the Ley Orgánica 8/2013, de 9 de diciembre, para la mejora de la calidad educativa (LOMCE, Organic Law for the improvement of educational quality) that expands upon Article 27 of the Spanish Constitution of 1978. The Spanish education system is compulsory and free for all children aged between 6 and 16 years and is supported by the national government together with the governments of each of the country's 17 autonomous communities.

In Spain, primary school and secondary school are considered basic (obligatory) education. These are Primaria (6–12 years old), which is the Spanish equivalent of elementary school and the first year of middle school, and Secundaria (12–16 years old), which would be a mixture of the last two years of middle school and the first two years of High school in the United States.

Spain is working towards reforming vocational education and modernizing education to halt and reverse the rising unemployment rates.

As of 2020–21, Spain has 9,909,886 students. The largest group corresponds to primary education, with 4,654,727 students followed by secondary education with 2,730,036 and university students with 1,633,358. The smallest group is those in vocational education, with 887,710 students.

Competences 
The Spanish Constitution of 1978 establishes that the national government as well as the autonomous communities have competences in the Education. The articles that are about that fact are the 148th and the 149th. The national government has the power to decide the academic and professional certificates and the requirements for their acquisition. It also establishes the subjects that are taught, the assessment criteria and its expression.

Stages

Preschool education
Preescolar or Educación Infantil is encouraged for children under the age of six. There are two cycles of preschool which are divided by age; 0–3 years old and 3–6 years old. The first cycle is often held in daycare centers or preschools, Escuela Infantil colloquially Guardería, and most of the time it isn't free for students, although some city councils offer scholarships for their public preschool centers with limited places. The second cycle is free for all students enrolled in public schools that offer Educación Infantil (early childhood education), and is often held in Centro de Educación Infantil y Primaria, colloquially Colegio. The second cycle of preschool in public schools focus in on emotional development, movement and control of body habits, communication and language, and positive body image. The documents required for public registration include proof of residence, passport or residence card, or child's birth certificate, and, in some areas, proof of the child's vaccinations and a medical certificate of health.

Primary education
Primaria or Educación Primaria, consists of six years, structured as three cycles, from first grade through sixth grade.
 First Cycle: 1st and 2nd grade
 Second Cycle: 3rd and 4th grade
 Third Cycle: 5th and 6th grade

Subjects
 Spanish Language and Literature
 Mathematics and science
 Natural science
 Social science 
 Physical education
 First Foreign Language (English)
Artistic education: Arts and Crafts and Music
 Second Foreign Language (French)
 Third Foreign Language (German)
Citizenship and Human Rights' Education
Ethical Values / Religion (Catholic, Jewish, Muslim or Protestant)
Regional Language: Catalan, Galician, Basque, Valencian, Aragonese, Occitan-Aranese or Asturian (if so)

Secondary education
Secundaria or Educación Secundaria (ESO) consists of four years, structured as two cycles, from seventh to tenth grade:
 First Cycle: 1st and 2nd year ('core academic subjects' + basic social science)
 Second Cycle: 3rd and 4th year ('core' academic subjects + liberal studies + optional courses which relate to the specific ambitions of the student)

Subjects

Post-16 education
Spanish Baccalaureate or Bachillerato consists of two optional additional final years in high school (mandatory education is until students are 16 years old), required if the student wants to attend University. Once students have finished Bachillerato, they can take their University Entrance Exam, Pruebas de Acceso a la Universidad (PAU), popularly called Selectividad. La Selectividad is composed of two parts: the "general" section, which is mandatory for everyone, and the "specific" section, which consists of focus topics based on the students' academic interests and is theoretically optional. La Selectividad is scored out of 14 points and students grade average and this score is then used to calculate students overall grade point average. In fact, 60% of this overall score is composed based on the students' GPA in Bachillerato and 40% of the score is based on the Selectividad grade.

Subjects

Vocational education 
There are three levels of education for professional skills acquisition besides the university education. These levels are Formación Profesional Básica or FPB (basic vocational education); Ciclo Formativo de Grado Medio or CFGM (medium level vocational education), which can be studied after the secondary education; and the Ciclo Formativo de Grado Superior or CFGS (higher level vocational education), which can be studied after the post-16 education.

There are 26 groups for these degrees and they include them by professional areas. 18 courses can be studied in the FPB, 62 in CFGM and 90 in CFGS.

Schools
Schools in Spain can be divided into 3 categories:
 State schools (colegios públicos)
 Privately run schools funded by the State (colegios concertados)
 Purely private schools (colegios privados)

According to summary data for the year 2008-2009 from the ministry, state schools educated 67.4%, private but state funded schools 26.0%, and purely private schools 6.6% of pupils the preceding year. Usually, primaria is studied in a colegio and ESO and bachillerato are studied in an instituto. However, some schools only teach elementary school (K-6). Also, K-12 schools also exist, although they are private schools or privately run schools funded by the State (colegios concertados). There are private schools for all the range of compulsory education. At them, parents must pay a monthly/termly/yearly fee. Most of these schools are run by religious orders, and also include single-sex schools.

All non-university state education is free in Spain, but parents have to buy (or make a contribution towards) their children's books and materials. (Subsidies, loans or second hand book sales are offered by Spain's Autonomous Regions (Comunidades), in some schools and by some local councils.) This, nominally at least, also applies to colegios concertados. Many schools are concertados, state funded up to the end of Primaria but purely private for the high school years. This drop in the proportion of pupils in educación concertada is matched by increases of approximately equal size in the proportion in both state and purely private education for ESO and Bachillerato.

Schools supply a list of what is required at the start of each school year and which will include art and craft materials as well as text and exercise books. From 2009, this figure was around £300 and in 2011 was nearer £500; as of 2011, the cost of books averaged 170 euros for preschool and 300 euros for elementary school students. In some regions, the autonomous government is giving tokens to exchange them in book shops for free. This was adapted in 2006 in regions such as Andalusia, where pupils from 3 to 10 years old will get the books for free, and in subsequent years it is expected for all compulsory years. School uniform is not normally worn in state schools but is usually worn in private schools.

There is a largely uniform admissions process for state funded schools, both colegios públicos and colegios concertados. The main admissions procedures for pupils wishing to join a school in the autumn are carried out in the spring of the year in question.

Parents can choose the school to which they wish to send their child. It is not uncommon for there to be insufficient places in a popular school for all the children for whom places are requested. In such cases, places are allocated according to rather strictly defined admissions criteria as defined in Annex IX to the order establishing the process.

Public schools
Schools run directly by the public authorities or privately with public assistance (concertada) provide education free of charge, but (depending on the family's financial status), parents may be required to supply consumables such as textbooks and school uniforms as well as contributing to after school activities.

Primaria public schools (6–12 years old) are called centro de educación infantil y primaria (CEIP), colloquially colegio or cole, and secundaria public schools (12–16 years old) are called instituto de enseñanza secundaria (IES), colloquially instituto. Public (state) schools in Spain are free.

Private schools
Private schools in Spain vary:some of the schools teach entirely in Spanish; some are run as Catholic schools; some are private and bilingual or trilingual and some are international schools which place emphasis on a second language, generally English. Private schools that are state subsidized (educación concertada) are required to follow the Spanish syllabus, while international schools are free to follow other curriculums typically from other countries such as the US or UK. Private schools tend to be more costly especially in Barcelona or Madrid. Fees include tuition as well as school supplies and uniform.

School terms
Broadly similar to the British three-term system, but with slightly shorter holidays at Christmas (22 December – 7 January) and Easter (one week - 40 days after Ash Wednesday), and longer in the summer (normally from 23 June to 15 September). In 2005, the summer holiday ran from 22 June until 1–15 September, depending on the regions. The British half-term holiday does not exist, but there are frequent odd days and long weekends relating mainly to religious holidays and regional and national holidays. Schools use the trimester system (September to December, January to March/April, March/April to June).

Bilingual teaching models 
In Spain, Spanish coexists with Basque, Catalan and Galician as the medium of instruction. Aranese (Aranés) is official in a small area of Catalonia and primary education is offered in this language. The linguistic model chosen by the regions with their own language varies per community.

Basque regions 
Basque Country historically provided three teaching models: A, B or D. Model D, with education entirely in Basque, and Spanish as a compulsory subject, is the most widely chosen model by parents. In addition, Navarre offers the G model, with education entirely in Spanish, without a Basque language subject option. Model A offers Spanish as tuition language and Basque is learnt as a language subject. Model B offers 50% of the classes in Spanish and Basque.

The Basque Country approved its bilingual model in a decree of 1983. Navarre enacted its corresponding decree in 1988.

Catalan regions 

Catalonia and the Balearic Islands employ language immersion in Catalan.

After the 1970s, when Spain became a democracy, Catalonia was given rights over its own education system. A law passed in 1983, "Llei de Normalització Lingüística", defined the language immersion system of Catalonia. By 1986 the entire region had already switched to it.

The Balearic Islands took more time to make language immersion effective. A decree enacted in 1997 established that Catalan must be used in at least 50% of lessons. Schools have freedom to add more lessons, and usually they do.

Valencian Community offers different levels of immersion in Catalan (also known as Valencian in this territory), with the highest level having the widest adoption. Before implementing that model, the community offered two paths. One path taught Catalan in the Catalan language subject and used it as tuition language in either Social or Natural Science. The other path provided immersion in Catalan, approaching the level of the newer advanced immersion.

The immersion models have faced strong opposition by Spanish nationalists. They allege that schools are used as indoctrination centres and that this imposes barriers which worsens academic performance. There is no serious investigation that proves that academic results are worse for bilingual students. Also proficiency in Spanish amongst Catalan students is the same as the Spanish average.

Galician regions 
In Galicia, Galician is used as tuition language in 50% of classes, except in preschool education which uses the majority mother tongue. This model approved by the People's Party has received criticism from the European Council.

Asturleonese regions 
Although Spanish is the official language of all schools in the Principality of Asturias, in many schools children are allowed to take Asturian-language classes from age 6 to 16. Elective classes are also offered from 16 to 19. Asturian is not co-official in the principality, but is protected by law (Ley 1/1998, de 23 de marzo, de uso y promoción del bable/asturiano — "Law 1/1998, of 23 March, of Use and Promotion of Bable/Asturian")

Leonese is not official or used in education in the Autonomous community of Castile and León, and Extramaduran is not recognised or official in Extramadura.

Aragonese regions 

The 1997 Aragonese law of languages stipulated that Aragonese (and Catalan) speakers had a right to the teaching of and in their own language. Following this, Aragonese lessons started in schools in the 1997–1998 academic year. It was originally taught as an extra-curricular, non-evaluable voluntary subject in four schools. However, whilst legally schools can choose to use Aragonese as the language of instruction, as of the 2013–2014 academic year, there are no recorded instances of this option being taken in primary or secondary education. In fact, the only current scenario in which Aragonese is used as the language of instruction is in the Aragonese philology university course, which is optional, taught over the summer and in which only some of the lectures are in Aragonese.

Occitan (Aranese) in Val d'Aran 
The protection of Aranese, a dialect of Occitan, is guaranteed in Article 3.4 of Catalonia's 1979 Statute of Autonomy. Subsequently, Law 7/1983, on linguistic normalization, declares Aranese the language of Aran, proclaims certain linguistic rights of the Aranese and directs public service to guarantee its usage and teaching. Aranese is taught on all levels of compulsory education and has been the medium of instruction in the Aran Valley since 1984.

Fala in Extremadura 
Fala is not recognised or official regionally in Extramadura, and not used in education.

International education
As of January 2015, the International Schools Consultancy (ISC) listed Spain as having 210 international schools. ISC defines an 'international school' in the following terms "ISC includes an international school if the school delivers a curriculum to any combination of pre-school, primary or secondary students, wholly or partly in English outside an English-speaking country, or if a school in a country where English is one of the official languages, offers an English-medium curriculum other than the country's national curriculum and is international in its orientation." This definition is used by publications including The Economist. In 1977 the International Baccalaureate authorized the first school in Spain to teach the Diploma Programme. There are now 86 IB World Schools in Spain, of which 71 deliver an international education but in Spanish.

See also
Academic Awards in Spain
Asociación de Inspectores de Educación
Open access in Spain

References

Further reading

 Llavador, José Beltrán, and Daniel Gabaldón-Estevan. "Framework for Sociological Research on Education in Spain." Journal of Educational Sociology 102 (2018): 145-151. online

 Ochoa, Sarah Carrica, and Aurora Bernal Martínez de Soria. "The current framework of Development Education in Spain: achievements and challenges." Revista Iberoamericana de Estudios de Desarrollo= Iberoamerican Journal of Development Studies 8.1 (2019): 164-185. online
 Rodriguez Garcia, Jose Antonio. "Islamic religious education and the plan against violent radicalization in Spain." British Journal of Religious Education 41.4 (2019): 412-421.

Economic aspects
 Alba-Ramirez, Alfonso, and Maria Jesus San Segundo. "The returns to education in Spain." Economics of Education Review 14.2 (1995): 155-166. online
 Albert, Cecilia. "Higher education demand in Spain: The influence of labour market signals and family background." Higher Education 40.2 (2000): 147-162. online
 de la Escosura, Leandro Prados, and Joan R. Rosés. "Human capital and economic growth in Spain, 1850–2000." Explorations in Economic History 47.4 (2010): 520-532. online
 Lassibille, Gerard, and Lucia Navarro Gomez. "The evolution of returns to education in Spain 1980–1991." Education Economics 6.1 (1998): 3-9.
 Oliver, Josep, et al. "Returns to human capital in Spain: A survey of the evidence." in Returns to human capital in Europe: a literature review (ETLA, The Research Institute of the Finnish Economy, Helsinki (1999) pp: 279-297. online
 Teixeira, Pedro, et al. "Mass higher education and its civic impacts in Portugal and Spain." Journal of Education Finance 46.4 (2021): 496-518.

Historical

 Beltrán Tapia, F. J. and Martinez-Galarraga, J. "Inequality and education in pre-industrial economies: evidence from Spain", Explorations in Economic History, 69 (2018), pp. 81–101. online

 Boyd, Carolyn P. "The Anarchists and Education in Spain, 1868-1909." Journal of Modern History 48.S4 (1976): 125-170.
 Cappelli, Gabriele, and Gloria Quiroga Valle. "Female teachers and the rise of primary education in Italy and Spain, 1861–1921: evidence from a new dataset." Economic History Review 74.3 (2021): 754-783. online

 de Guzmán, Victoria Pérez, Juan Trujillo-Herrera, and Encarna Bas Pena. "History and Microhistories of Social Education in Spain." Oxford Research Encyclopedia of Education (2021).

External links
Spanish Ministry of Education 
Schools and Universities Guide to Study in Spain
Spanish Ministry of Education, Social Politics and Sports 
 Information on education in Spain, OECD - Contains indicators and information about Spain and how it compares to other OECD and non-OECD countries
 Diagram of Spanish education system, OECD - Using 1997 ISCED classification of programs and typical ages. Also in Spanish